You wouldn't like me when I'm angry may refer to:

a catchphrase of the Hulk, a comic book character
"Youwouldn'tlikemewhenI'mangry", a 2014 song by Thom Yorke

Quotations from comics
1979 neologisms